The C-class lifeboats were Zodiac Grand Raid Mark IVs powered by twin 40 hp outboards and was formerly operated by the Royal National Lifeboat Institution of the United Kingdom and Ireland. It was replaced by the D-class (EA16) and B-class (Atlantic 21).

Fleet

Notes

References

External links
RNLI Fleet

Royal National Lifeboat Institution lifeboats
Ship classes